Lepospondyli is a diverse taxon of early tetrapods. With the exception of one late-surviving lepospondyl from the Late Permian of Morocco (Diplocaulus minumus), lepospondyls lived from the Early Carboniferous (Mississippian) to the Early Permian and were geographically restricted to what is now Europe and North America. Five major groups of lepospondyls are known: Adelospondyli; Aïstopoda; Lysorophia; Microsauria; and Nectridea. Lepospondyls have a diverse range of body forms and include species with newt-like, eel- or snake-like, and lizard-like forms. Various species were aquatic, semiaquatic, or terrestrial. None were large (the biggest genus, the diplocaulid Diplocaulus, reached a meter in length, but most were much smaller), and they are assumed to have lived in specialized ecological niches not taken by the more numerous temnospondyl amphibians that coexisted with them in the Paleozoic. 
Lepospondyli was named in 1888 by Karl Alfred von Zittel, who coined the name to include some tetrapods from the Paleozoic that shared some specific characteristics in the notochord and teeth. Lepospondyls have sometimes been considered to be either related or ancestral to modern amphibians or to Amniota (the clade containing reptiles and mammals). It has been suggested that the grouping is polyphyletic, with aïstopods being primitive stem-tetrapods, while recumbirostran microsaurs are primitive reptiles.

Description

All lepospondyls are characterised by having simple, spool-shaped vertebrae that did not ossify from cartilage, but rather grew as bony cylinders around the notochord. In addition, the upper portion of the vertebra, the neural arch, is usually fused to the centrum (the main body of the vertebra).

Classification
The position of the Lepospondyli within the Tetrapoda is uncertain because the earliest lepospondyls were already highly specialized when they first appeared in the fossil record. Some lepospondyls were once thought to be related or perhaps ancestral to modern salamanders (Urodela), but not the other modern amphibians. This view is no longer held and all modern amphibians (frogs, salamanders, and caecilians) are now grouped within the clade Lissamphibia. For a long time, the Lepospondyli were considered one of the three subclasses of Amphibia, along with the Lissamphibia and the Labyrinthodontia. However, the dissolution of "labyrinthodonts" into separate groups such as temnospondyls and anthracosaurs has cast doubt on these traditional amphibian subclasses.  Much like "Labyrinthodontia", some studies proposed that Lepospondyli is an artificial (polyphyletic) grouping with some members closely related to extinct stem tetrapod groups and others more closely related to modern amphibians or reptiles. Early phylogenetic analyses conducted in the 1980s and 1990s often maintained the idea that lepospondyls were paraphyletic, with nectrideans close to colosteids and microsaurs close to temnospondyls, which were considered to be ancestral to modern amphibians.

However, a 1995 paper by Robert Carroll argued that lepospondyls were actually a monophyletic group closer to reptiles. Carroll considered them closer to reptiles than the seymouriamorphs, but not as close as the diadectomorphs. Many phylogenetic analyses since Carroll (1995) agreed with his interpretation, including Laurin & Reisz (1997),  Anderson (2001), and Ruta et al. (2003). A few have still considered lepospondyls ancestral to amphibians, but came to this conclusion without changing the position of lepospondyls compared to seymouriamorphs and diadectomorphs.

Lepospondyl and tetrapod classification is still controversial, and even recent studies have had doubts about lepospondyl monophyly. For example, a 2007 paper has suggested that adelospondyls are stem-tetrapods close to colosteids and a 2017 paper on Lethiscus has  Aïstopoda in the tetrapod stem based on their primitive braincase. These studies differ in the internal and external relationships of the remaining lepospondyl taxa. The former places the remaining lepospondyls into a single clade along the amniote stem. The latter does not treat the relationships of nectrideans or adelospondyls, but finds microsaurs to be early amniotes, and places lysorophians within microsaurs.

Interrelationships
Five main groups of lepospondyls are often recognized: Microsauria, a superficially lizard- or salamander-like and species-rich group; Lysorophia, a group with elongated bodies and very small limbs; Aïstopoda, a group of limbless, extremely elongated snake-like forms; Adelospondyli, a group of presumably aquatic forms that resemble aïstopods, but have more solidly built skulls; and Nectridea, another diverse group that includes terrestrial and aquatic newt-like forms. Microsauria is generally considered paraphyletic; rather than being a monophyletic group, it has been considered an evolutionary grade of basal ("primitive") lepospondyls, although there is growing consensus that a large subset of fossorially-adapted microsaurs, the Recumbirostra, is monophyletic. Lysorophia may belong within the Recumbirostran clade, distinct from other derived lepospondyls. Nectridea may also be paraphyletic, consisting of a range of more anatomically-specialized lepospondyls. The name Holospondyli has been proposed for a clade including aïstopods, and nectrideans, and possibly adelospondyls, although not all recent phylogenetic analyses support the grouping. The following cladogram, simplified, is after an analysis of tetrapods and stem-tetrapods presented by Ruta et al. in 2003:

Position within Tetrapoda
The "lepospondyl hypothesis" of modern amphibian origins proposes that lissamphibians are monophyletic (that is, they form their own clade) and that they evolved from lepospondyl ancestors. Two alternatives are the "temnospondyl hypothesis", in which lissamphibians originated within Temnospondyli, and the "polyphyly hypothesis", in which caecilians originated from lepospondyls while frogs and salamanders (collectively grouped within Batrachia) evolved from temnospondyls. Of the three hypotheses, the temnospondyl hypothesis is currently the most widely accepted among researchers. Strong support for this relationship comes from a suite of anatomical features shared between lissamphibians and a group of Paleozoic temnospondyls called dissorophoids. Under this hypothesis, Lepospondyli either falls outside crown group Tetrapoda (the smallest clade containing all living tetrapods, i.e. the smallest clade containing Lissamphibia and Amniota), or is closer to amniotes and therefore part of Reptiliomorpha. However, some phylogenetic analyses continue to find support for the lepospondyl hypothesis. The analysis by Vallin and Laurin (2004) found lissamphibians to be most closely related to lysorophians, followed by microsaurs. Pawley (2006) also found lysorophians to be the closest relatives of lissamphibians, but found aïstopods and adelogyrinids rather than microsaurs to be the second most closely related groups. Marjanović (2010) found holospondyls to be the most closely related group to lissamphibians, followed by lysorophians. Under this hypothesis, lepospondyls would be crown tetrapods and temnospondyls would be stem tetrapods.

Below is a cladogram from Ruta et al. (2003) that supports the "temnospondyl hypothesis", showing the position of Lepospondyli within crown group Tetrapoda:

Gallery

References

 Benton, M. J. (2000), Vertebrate Paleontology, 2nd ed. Blackwell Science Ltd
 Benton, M. J. (2004), Vertebrate Paleontology, 3rd ed. Blackwell Science Ltd Taxonomic hierarchy
 Colbert, E H. (1969), Evolution of the Vertebrates, John Wiley & Sons Inc (2nd ed.)
 Laurin, Michel (1996) Terrestrial Vertebrates - Stegocephalians: Tetrapods and other digit-bearing vertebrates
 Romer, A.S., (1966) Vertebrate Paleontology University of Chicago Press, 1933; 3rd ed. 1966.

External links

 Lepospondyli

 
Mississippian first appearances
Lopingian extinctions
Fossil taxa described in 1888
Polyphyletic groups